The South Africa women's cricket team toured Ireland to play against the Ireland women's cricket team in June 2022. The tour consisted of three Women's Twenty20 International (WT20I) and three Women's One Day International (WODI) matches. The WODI matches were the part of 2022–2025 ICC Women's Championship. In May 2022, Cricket South Africa named their squad for the tour, with Suné Luus leading the side in Dane van Niekerk's absence. Likewise, Cricket Ireland named their squad, with Gaby Lewis captaining the side, with Laura Delany out due to an injury. Lewis also became the youngest player to captain the Ireland Women's team in international cricket.

Ireland won the opening WT20I match of the tour by ten runs. It was only Ireland's second win in the format against South Africa, with the first win coming in August 2016. South Africa won the second match by eight wickets to level the series, with Lara Goodall scoring her first half-century in WT20Is. South Africa also won the third WT20I by eight wickets, to win the series 2–1.

In the first WODI match, Ireland were bowled out for just 69 runs. South Africa chased down the target of 70 runs in 16 overs, winning the match by nine wickets. In the next match, Ireland made an improved performance when batting, making 213/8 from their 50 overs. However, South Africa chased the target down with more than eleven overs to spare, winning again by nine wickets, to win the series with a match to play. South Africa won the third and final match by 189 runs, with Shabnim Ismail taking her second five-wicket haul in WODI cricket, winning the series 3–0.

Squads

Ahead of the WODI matches, Ireland's Celeste Raack was granted permission to leave the squad due to family reasons.

WT20I series

1st WT20I

2nd WT20I

3rd WT20I

WODI series

1st WODI

2nd WODI

3rd WODI

References

External links
 Series home at ESPN Cricinfo

South Africa 2022
Ireland 2022
International cricket competitions in 2022
2022 in Irish cricket
2022 in South African cricket
2022 in women's cricket